Little Bill: Books for Beginning Readers is a series of twelve children's books by Bill Cosby and Varnette Honeywood. Cosby wrote the stories, while Honeywood created the characters and made the illustrations in her typical collage style. The books are aimed at readers aged 7 to 10 and were released from 1997 to 1999.

The books follow a young African-American boy named Little Bill. Every story is told in the first person, and the books cover topics like boredom, bullies, honesty, courage, family, and friendship. The characters are rendered in a "bold, blocky" style with bright colors and simplified forms.

All of the books were dedicated to Cosby's late son, Ennis Cosby, and the character of Little Bill was based on him. Little Bill's catchphrase "Hello, friend!" was originally a greeting that Ennis used.

In 1999, the books were adapted into an animated series on Nickelodeon, also called Little Bill. Discussions to adapt the books took place as early as December 1997, when it was reported that Nickelodeon was "planning to produce three Little Bill specials, and a five-day-a-week series is under discussion."

Reception
The books received positive reviews, with critics praising the realistic stories and dialogue. Karen MacPherson of the Scripps Howard News Service said that "the books' story line and dialog is candid and rings true, while the bold, expressively colored illustrations by Varnette P. Honeywood help keep the reader's interest." The Bulletin of the Center for Children's Books wrote that "there's a vulnerable commonality to Little Bill that many young readers will warm to." Writing for the Orange County Register, Sandra Draper said that both "children and parents can relate to the realistic tone of the stories."

In December 1997, Oprah Winfrey chose three of the Little Bill books as selections for Oprah's Book Club. This marked the first time that children's books were selected.

References

1997 children's books
Series of children's books
American children's books